The Chopsticks was a short-lived female duo in Hong Kong. They were the first all-female modern music singing group to be marketed and launched from Hong Kong.

They started singing in the late 1960s with HK English pop songs and were contracted with the local Crown Records between 1969 and 1972, having a release total of four LP albums and not more than 10 SP/EPs. In 1973, the duo split and both Sandra Lang and Amina went solo.

Discography

External links
 樂多日誌 - 陶醉的六七十年代情懷 (筷子姊妹花 The Chopsticks)

Hong Kong musical groups
Chinese musical groups
English-language singers from Hong Kong